The following is a list of ballparks. They are ordered by capacity; which is the maximum number of spectators the stadium can accommodate in a normal game (ex: Tropicana Field can be expanded to 42,000+ but is normally capped at 25,000). Currently all baseball parks with a capacity of 20,000 or more are included.

See also
Sapporo Dome (capacity: 53,796). Home of the Hokkaido Nippon Ham Fighters (2004-2022)
Olympic Stadium (Montreal) (capacity: 49,757).  Home of the Montreal Expos (1977-2004), and hosted Toronto Blue Jays exhibition games from 2014-2019

Baseball field
List of Major League Baseball stadiums
List of U.S. baseball stadiums by capacity
List of terraces at baseball venues
List of jewel box baseball parks

References 

Capacity
b
Ballparks